The Admiral Wells is a public house in Holme, Huntingdonshire, now in Cambridgeshire. Nearby Holme Fen is 2.75 metres (9.0 feet) below sea level, and the Admiral Wells claims to be the lowest pub in Great Britain. However, large-scale maps show the pub itself is approximately 4 metres above sea level, so this claim appears to be incorrect.

History 
In the late 1840s, William Wells, who had inherited the nearby Holmewood Hall from his father Captain William Wells, drained Whittlesey Mere. By 1852, the area was dry and available for agriculture. Using his new-found wealth, Wells built a pub on the land and named it The Admiral Wells after his grandfather, Thomas Wells.

References

Buildings and structures in Cambridgeshire